Ellen Barry may refer to:

 Ellen Barry (tennis) (born 1989), New Zealand tennis player
 Ellen Barry (journalist) (born 1971), American journalist for The New York Times
 Ellen Barry (attorney) (born 1955), American attorney and public interest lawyer
 Ellen Semple Barry (1899–1995), American portrait artist and wife of playwright Philip Barry